Maud, Alabama may refer to the following places in Alabama:
Maud, Bibb County, Alabama
Maud, Colbert County, Alabama